Isodemis hainanensis is a moth of the family Tortricidae. It is known from Hainan, China.

The wingspan is about 17.5 mm for males and 22 mm for females. The head, antenna and labial palpus are grayish brown, mixed with brownish-black scales. The thorax and tegula are brownish black, with sparse grayish-brown scales. The forewings are dark yellowish brown, tinged with ochreous scales in the distal half. The hindwings and cilia are grayish brown. The legs are dark yellowish brown, mottled brownish black on the ventral side of the foreleg and on the outer side of the mid- and hindlegs. The abdomen is dark grayish brown.

Etymology
The name is derived from the type locality, Hainan.

External links

Review of the genus Isodemis Diakonoff (Lepidoptera, Tortricidae) from China, with description of three new species

Archipini